John C. Andreason (April 20, 1929 – October 16, 2017) was an American politician.

Life and career 
John Andreason was born in Idaho Falls, Idaho, and lived in Boise, Idaho. Andreason graduated from Arco High School in 1947. Andreason attended Idaho State University and received his B.S. in Political Science from the University of Idaho in 1974.

He was a Master Sergeant for the United States Air Force from 1950 to 1958. Before becoming a Senator, Andreason was the Director of the Idaho Legislative Budget Office for 23 years. Andreason served in many civic organizations and held many political offices. Andreason served a term from 1969 to 1970 in the Idaho State Senate before he was elected again in 1995. Andreason served until 2012.

He was married to Darlene Andreason and they had four children together. Andreason was a member of the Church of Jesus Christ of Latter-day Saints. Andreason died from liver cancer on October 16, 2017, in Boise, Idaho.

Committees 
Andreason is served on the following committees:
 Commerce and Human Resources - Chair
 Education

Civic organizations 
Past and Present organizations, charity involvement:
 Past Deputy District Governor, Loins International
 Past Staff Chair, National Conference of State Legislatures (NCSL)
 President, National Fiscal Officers Association
 Member of NCSL Executive Committee
 Treasurer of the National Education Commission of the States
 Past vice-chair of the National Education Commission of the States

Political organizations
Dates and Titles of previously held political offices:
 Senator, Idaho State Senate, 1969–70, 1995–2012
 County Chair, Republican Party, 1964–1968
 State Committeeman, 1960–1964
 Precinct Committeeman, 1955–1960
 Former Member of the Arco, Idaho City Council

References

External links
 Ballotpedia.org
 Ballotpedia.org

1929 births
2017 deaths
Latter Day Saints from Idaho
Republican Party Idaho state senators
University of Idaho alumni
People from Idaho Falls, Idaho
People from Boise, Idaho
Idaho State University alumni
Military personnel from Idaho
United States Air Force airmen
Idaho city council members
Deaths from cancer in Idaho
Deaths from liver cancer
People from Butte County, Idaho